Major General James L. Murray (January 4, 1919 – May 9, 2004) was a United States Air Force officer and Engineering Project Manager for the XB-52 at Wright-Patterson Air Force Base.

Biography
Major General James Lore Murray's Air Force and aerospace career spanned 50 years. He died May 9 in Point Clear, AL. In WWII he was a flight instructor for B-17, B-24 and B-29, aircraft, Gunter Field, AL. He was a test pilot at Moffett Field, CA. He worked for the NACA C-46 icing research airplane leading to modern thermal de-icing technology necessary for the advancement of aeronautics. Later Gen. James Lore worked as Chief of Special Projects, Wright Field, he promoted the jet ejection seat escape system. Gen. Murray was the Engineering Project Manager for the B-52. He flew over 5,500 hours in 60 types of aircraft receiving the Distinguished Service Medal.

General James L. Murray started his Air Force career as an instructor; his 5,500 flying hours covered the whole Stearman period. Brought PT-13 biplane trainers to the North American F-86 Sabre.

Notable among his students were members of the Tuskegee Airmen 332nd Fighter Group (99th Pursuit Group) and the aviation author Ernest K. Gann, who referred to him as "a most skillful young Army pilot."

From 1945 to 1948, he flew a Curtiss-Wright C-46 Commando flying laboratory on 122 missions to gather icing data as part of the NASA Ames Research Centre's effort to develop modern anti-ice systems. 

As Chief of the Special Projects Branch of the Aircraft Laboratory at Wright-Patterson Air Force Base from 1948 to 1950, then-Major Murray led the effort to persuade aircraft manufacturers and operational Air Force units to accept the ejection seat as a safe and effective means of escape at high speed. The seat testing took place at Edwards Air Force Base located in Palmdale, California. The seat was attached to a sled that was connected to a stretch of railroad. It was propelled by rockets at high speed, which at the end launched a dummy from the seat with a parachute. When it came time to attempt an ejection from an aircraft in flight, Major Murray discovered that the seat didn't fit properly in the cockpit of the aircraft that it was designed for, so ultimately the seat chassis was sent to Van Nuys Airport in Los Angeles for modifications. It was a "go" after the seat was corrected. Major Murray was flying in an aircraft next to the test plane. The test plane was flown by a close friend and test pilot, who began to steer the plane towards the ground, and Major Murray witnessed the first ejection from the air. The test railroad tracks are still in existence today at Edwards Air Force Base as a reminder of this profound safety achievement and lifesaver for pilots.

General Murray survived two plane crashes in his lifetime. The first was before the ejection seat took place when he was instructing a student that was one of The Tuskegee Airmen. They were flying in a single-engine, two-seater trainer aircraft with a slide-back canopy over Florida. An oil hose broke, and they lost engine power. Murray was able to take control of the plane and land it in a swampy field, causing severe damage to the engine and belly of the plane. They were not injured. The second plane crash was when he was an executive for an aerospace company and was aboard the company's business jet as a passenger, in Michigan. Forced to make an emergency landing on a partially iced-over lake, Murray suffered burns after the crash which he survived.

While he was the Engineering Project Manager for the XB-52 at Wright-Patterson Air Force Base from 1951 to 1952, Lt. Col. Murray worked with future Boeing chairman "T" A. Wilson and many others overseeing the development of the aircraft.

General Murray had worked for a division of Lockheed Skunk Works. He was assigned to the project development of "The Black Missile". This was the first missile that was undetectable by radar. It was built in a large tan-colored hangar located on the north corner of the Burbank Airport in Burbank, California. The hangar was owned by Lockheed Skunk Works Division. It was accessed via San Fernando Road. This hangar was not the typical hangar. It was larger than normal and heavily guarded. There were no signs of what was really going on there. General Murray worked there daily, entering the door on the west side of the hangar. He explained, upon entering the hangar there was an enormous black curtain that was drawn across the center of the hangar, splitting the workspace. He stayed on his side and the other workers stayed on their side. They never saw each other or looked beyond the curtain. General Murray was advised that the other side of the curtain contained a highly classified development, as his project wasn't classified enough. Years later, General Murray discovered what was going on behind the curtain. He was told by the first stealth aircraft that it was in the early stages of development and testing. Murray declined to speak about which aircraft. The hangar was torn down in the year 2002, closing another door to history.

After being commissioned in the active Air Force Reserve in 1955, Murray eventually retired as a Major General in 1975 and was known as a "Cosmic Secret" security clearance. He was acknowledged with the Air Force Distinguished Service Medal. He had held several executive positions in the aerospace industry, among them as vice-president of the C-5 division at the Douglas Aircraft Company. Later he had a 20-year career where he served as a Chairman as well as president/CEO of Teledyne/CAE, creator of the Boeing Harpoon and Tomahawk missile engine.

Gen. Murray was a member of Conquistadores del Cielo, The Burning Tree Club and a trustee of the USAF Falcon Foundation.

September 11, 2001, General Murray was 82 years of age. General Murray, a true patriot watching the aftermath of the 9/11 attacks unfold on television, to his youngest son, "If I weren't 82 years old, I would re-enlist and go fight!

General Murray died on May 9, 2004, at the age of 85. He is survived by his wife Phyllis Jennings Murray; daughters Lucy Howell, Marilyn Van Dyke, Margaret Harcourt, and sons James L. Murray, Jr., Mark Murray, Kenneth Murray, Bret Murray, and nine grandchildren and one great-grandchild. Major General James Lore Murray was interred in the Arlington National Cemetery.

References

External links
 Congressional Record Tribute by Senator Jeff Sessions
 Development of the B-52 The Wright Field Story Lori S. Tagg
 Life without a compass: with revealing comments about the decline of the Douglas Aircraft Company / James L. Murray
 NACA Technical Note 1424 Appreciation Major Murray

United States Air Force generals
Recipients of the Air Force Distinguished Service Medal
1919 births
2004 deaths
American test pilots
Burials at Arlington National Cemetery
People from Newton, North Carolina
Military personnel from North Carolina